Inconfundible is the sixth studio album by the Puerto Rican salsa singer Víctor Manuelle, released on September 28, 1999.

Track listing
This information adapted from AllMusic.

Chart performance

Certification

See also
List of number-one Billboard Tropical Albums from the 1990s

References

1999 albums
Víctor Manuelle albums